Adventure of the King is a 2010 Hong Kong historical romantic comedy film directed by Chung Shu-kai and written by Tsang Kan-cheung, Chan Man-keung, and Lee Si-cheun. The film stars Richie Jen, Barbie Shu, Huo Siyan, and Law Kar-ying. The film premiered in Hong Kong and Mainland China on 19 August 2010.

Plot
It tells the love story between Zhengde Emperor and Li Fengjie, during the Ming Dynasty.

Cast

The royals
 Richie Jen as Zhengde Emperor, the Ming dynasty Emperor of China between 1505 and 1521.
 Huo Siyan as Infanta Chang Ci, Zhengde Emperor's sister.
 Fu Yiwei as Empress Zhang, Zhengde Emperor's mother.
 Law Kar-ying as Sima Xi, an official historian of Ming Dynasty.
 Leung Siu-lung as Chen Zhenzhen, Zhengde Emperor's bodyguard.
 Zhang Hongbin as Wang Siliang, Zhengde Emperor's imperial physician.
 Liu Yajin as Xu Fu, Ouchi manager.
 Wang Yu as Wang Yangming, idealist Neo-Confucian philosopher, official, educationist, calligraphist and general in the Ming dynasty.
 Bai Qing as Tangshi Zhongxia, a member of Jinyiwei.
 Chen Zhihui as Kuang Ye.
 Ji Shan as The princess of Shengping Country.
 Fung Hark-on as the robber.
 Cui Jian as the eunuch.

Faction of Zhu Chenhao
 Lin Wei as Zhu Chenhao, a member of Ming Dynasty's Royal Family.
 Wu Ma as Ma Duofu, a worker under Zhu Chenhao.
 He Yunwei as Private Adviser Ji, Zhu Chenhao's counsellor.

Member of Longfeng Restaurant
 Barbie Shu as Li Fengjie, the boss of Longfeng Restaurant.
 Chiu Chi-ling as Laogui, the cook of Longfeng Restaurant.
 Pan Changjiang as Li Xiaochong, Li Fengjie's elder brother.
 Miumiu Gong as Miao Miao, a worker of Longfeng Restaurant.

Guest star
 Zhou Libo as Wen Zhengming.
 Richie Jen as Xu Zhenqing.
 Huang Xiaoming as Tang Yin.
 Natalis Chan as Zhu Yunming.

Music
 Richie Jen – My Sweetheart.
 Richie Jen – Everlasting Love

Production
This film took place in Hengdian World Studios, Zhejiang.

Release
On 12 August 2010, Chung Shu Kai, Richie Jen, Huo Siyan and Barbie Shu attended the Press Conference in Guangzhou, and it was released on 19 August 2010.

Critical response
The film received negative reviews.

References

External links

 Adventure of the King 

2010s Mandarin-language films
Hong Kong romantic comedy films
Films set in 16th-century Ming dynasty
Films shot in Zhejiang
2010 romantic comedy films
2010s Hong Kong films